Deep South Paranormal is an American paranormal television series on Syfy that debuted April 10, 2013. As of June 2014, the series has been cancelled.

Summary
The series featured the Deep South Paranormal team, a group of ghost hunters from the deep south who followed their paranormal investigations to different reportedly haunted locations in the Southern United States .

Cast
Deep South Pararnormal team:

 Hart Fortenbery — The Godfather
 Jonathan Hodges — Team leader
 Benny Reed — The Joker
 Randy Hardy — The Daredevil
 Kali Hardy — The Rookie/Lil' Sis (Randy's little sister)
 Kevin Betzer — Tech Specialist
 Keith Ramsey — The Rocker

Episodes

See also
List of reportedly haunted locations in the United States
List of reportedly haunted locations in the world

References

External links

2010s American reality television series
2013 American television series debuts
2013 American television series endings
English-language television shows
Paranormal reality television series
Syfy original programming